

Championships

Professional
Men
2001 NBA Finals: Los Angeles Lakers over the Philadelphia 76ers 4-1.  MVP: Shaquille O'Neal
2000–01 NBA season, 2001 NBA Playoffs, 2001 NBA draft, 2001 NBA All-Star Game
Eurobasket: Yugoslavia 78, Turkey 69
Women
WNBA Finals: Los Angeles Sparks over the Charlotte Sting 2-0.  MVP: Lisa Leslie
2001 WNBA season, 2001 WNBA Playoffs, 2001 WNBA draft, 2001 WNBA All-Star Game
Eurobasket Women: France def. Russia

College
Men
NCAA Division I: Duke University 82, Arizona 72
National Invitation Tournament: University of Tulsa 79, University of Alabama 60
NCAA Division II: Kentucky Wesleyan College 72, Washburn University 63
NCAA Division III: Catholic 76, William Paterson College 62
NAIA Division I: Faulkner University 63, Oklahoma Science & Arts 59
NAIA Division II: Northwestern (Iowa) 82,	MidAmerica Nazarene University (Kan.) 78
Women
NCAA Division I: University of Notre Dame 68, Purdue University 66
NCAA Division II: Cal Poly Pomona 87, North Dakota State University 80 (OT)
NCAA Division III Washington (Mo.) 67, Messiah College 45
NAIA Division I: Oklahoma City University 69, Auburn University Montgomery (Ala.) 52
NAIA Division II Hastings College (Neb.) 73, Cornerstone University (Mich.) 69

Awards and honors

Professional
Men
NBA Most Valuable Player Award:   Allen Iverson
NBA Rookie of the Year Award: Mike Miller
NBA Defensive Player of the Year Award: Ben Wallace
NBA Coach of the Year Award: Larry Brown, Philadelphia 76ers
Euroscar Award: Peja Stojaković, Sacramento Kings and FR Yugoslavia
Mr. Europa: Peja Stojaković, Sacramento Kings and FR Yugoslavia
Women
WNBA Most Valuable Player Award: Lisa Leslie, Los Angeles Sparks
WNBA Defensive Player of the Year Award: Debbie Black, Miami Sol
WNBA Rookie of the Year Award: Jackie Stiles, Portland Fire
WNBA Most Improved Player Award: Janeth Arcain, Houston Comets
Kim Perrot Sportsmanship Award: Sue Wicks, New York Liberty
WNBA Coach of the Year Award: Dan Hughes, Cleveland Rockers
WNBA All-Star Game MVP: Lisa Leslie, Los Angeles Sparks
WNBA Finals Most Valuable Player Award: Lisa Leslie, Los Angeles Sparks

Collegiate 
 Combined
Legends of Coaching Award: Lute Olson, Arizona
 Men
John R. Wooden Award: Shane Battier, Duke
Naismith College Coach of the Year: Rod Barnes, Mississippi
Frances Pomeroy Naismith Award: Rashad Phillips, Detroit
Associated Press College Basketball Player of the Year: Shane Battier, Duke
NCAA basketball tournament Most Outstanding Player: Juan Dixon, Maryland
USBWA National Freshman of the Year: Eddie Griffin, Seton Hall
Associated Press College Basketball Coach of the Year: Matt Doherty, North Carolina
Naismith Outstanding Contribution to Basketball: Tex Winter
 Women
Naismith College Player of the Year: Ruth Riley, Notre Dame
Naismith College Coach of the Year: Muffet McGraw, Notre Dame
Wade Trophy: Jackie Stiles, Missouri State
Frances Pomeroy Naismith Award: Niele Ivey, Notre Dame
Associated Press Women's College Basketball Player of the Year: Ruth Riley, Notre Dame
NCAA basketball tournament Most Outstanding Player: Ruth Riley, Notre Dame
Basketball Academic All-America Team: Ruth Riley, Notre Dame
Carol Eckman Award: Juliene B. Simpson, East Stroudsburg University
Associated Press College Basketball Coach of the Year: Muffet McGraw, Notre Dame
Nancy Lieberman Award: Sue Bird, Connecticut
Naismith Outstanding Contribution to Basketball: Cathy Rush

Naismith Memorial Basketball Hall of Fame
Class of 2001:
 John Chaney
 Michael "Mike" Krzyzewski
 Moses E. Malone

Women's Basketball Hall of Fame
Class of 2001
 Van Chancellor
 Theresa Grentz
 Phyllis Holmes
 LaTaunya Pollard
 Linda K. Sharp
 C. Vivian Stringer
 Vanya Voynova
 Hazel Walker
 Rosie Walker
 Holly Warlick

Events

Movies
Pistol Pete: The Life and Times of Pete Maravich

Deaths
 January 7 — Ken Durrett, American NBA player and All-American at La Salle University (born 1948)
 January 17 — Garland O'Shields, American NBA player (Chicago Stags, Syracuse Nationals) (born 1921)
 January 26 — Al McGuire, Hall of Fame coach at Marquette and famed college basketball announcer (born 1928)
 February 3 — Bobby Colburn, American NBL player for the Dayton Metropolitans (born 1911)
 February 19 — Guy Rodgers, Hall of Fame player for the Philadelphia and San Francisco Warriors (born 1935)
 February 20 — Harry Boykoff, former St. John's and early NBA player (born 1922)
 April 25 — Clovis Stark, American NBL for the Dayton Metropolitans (born 1914)
 April 29 — Andy Phillip, Hall of Fame NBA player (born 1922)
 May 15 — Ralph Miller, Hall of Fame college coach at Wichita State, Iowa and Oregon State (born 1919)
 June 26 — George Senesky, NBA player and coach for the Philadelphia Warriors (born 1922)
 August 1 — Dwight Eddleman, All-American at Illinois and two-time NBA All-Star (born 1922)
 September 5 — Cawood Ledford, American radio announcer (Kentucky Wildcats) (born 1926)
 September 14 — George Ireland, coach of the 1963 NCAA national champion Loyola Ramblers (born 1913)
 October 13 — B. L. Graham, All-American college player and head coach (Ole Miss Rebels) (born 1914)
 October 20 — Nebojša Popović, Serbian player, coach and administrator and FIBA Hall of Fame member (born 1923)
 November 18 — Renato Righetto, Brazilian referee and FIBA Hall of Fame member (born 1921)
 November 23 — Gus Broberg, two-time All-American forward at Dartmouth College (born 1920)
 November 28 — Bob Cope, American college coach (Montana) (born 1928)
 December 8 — Mirza Delibašić, FIBA Hall of Fame player from Bosnia and 1980 Olympic Gold Medalist (born 1954)
 December 10 — Gus Doerner, American NBL player (Fort Wayne Pistons, Indianapolis Kautskys) (born 1922)
 December 13 – Larry Costello, American All-Star NBA player (Philadelphia 76ers) (born 1931)

References